Steve Kangas (Steven Robert Esh, May 11, 1961 – February 8, 1999) was a journalist, political activist and chess teacher known for his website Liberalism Resurgent  and highly political usenet postings. His stay in Berlin turned him from a conservative into an outspoken liberal. His writings were sharply critical of the business propaganda of the overclass and the CIA.  Kangas became increasingly fascinated with capitalists and began voicing his opinions and theories across the internet.

Death

On February 8, 1999, Kangas was found dead from a self-inflicted gunshot wound in a restroom on the 39th floor of the One Oxford Center, Pittsburgh, home to the offices of Richard Mellon Scaife. Kangas’ blood alcohol was 0.14 and his backpack contained 47 rounds of ammunition and a copy of Hitler's Mein Kampf.

References

External links
 Steve Kangas' homepage
 Pittsburgh Post-Gazette article
 An article about him at Spartacus Educational
 Activist Found Shot to Death Outside Billionaire's Office

1961 births
1999 suicides
American activist journalists
American military personnel who committed suicide
Suicides by firearm in Pennsylvania
20th-century American non-fiction writers